Reshat Arbana (born 15 September 1940) is an Albanian actor who interpreted around 35 characters in films and theatre receiving the award as People's Artist of Albania.

Career 
Arbana's first role was in 1963. After he finished his studies at the acting school Aleksander Mojsiu, near the National Theatre of Albania, in 1968 Arbana started to work at Radio Tirana. From 1977 until he retired, he worked as an actor at the National Theatre.

Arbana has been distinguished for his mastery interpretation of his roles. For his acting merits he has gained the People's Artist of Albania award.

References

1940 births
Albanian male stage actors
Albanian male film actors
People's Artists of Albania
People from Tirana
Living people
20th-century Albanian male actors